The Parliament House of Ghana is the official seat of the Speaker of Parliament of the country and also serves as Parliament of Ghana. It also has offices which serve temporal offices of certain members of parliament. It was designed by Kwame Nkrumah, the first president of Ghana.

History
The building was designed and built by Kwame Nkrumah, the first president of Ghana.

Calls for expansion
In 2011 Alfred Kwame Agbeshie, Member of Parliament for Ashaiman called for the building of a new parliament house to accommodate the increasing number of parliamentarians in the country. His assertion was based on the fact that members of parliament sat at distances away from the Speaker, making it difficult for some members to be recognized and allowed to contribute to debates.

See also
 Job 600

References

External links
 Parliament of Ghana Official website

Parliament of Ghana
Legislative buildings
Buildings and structures in Accra
Government buildings in Ghana
Government buildings completed in 1965